Nesiasi Pa Mataitonga (born 25 February 1993 in Auckland, New Zealand), also known by the nickname of '"Nesi"', is a Tonga international rugby league footballer who plays as a  and . He last played for RC Albi XIII in the Elite One Championship.

He last played for the London Broncos. He represented Tonga in the 2013 World Cup. He played for the Cronulla-Sutherland Sharks Under 20s side in 2012-2013.

In 2014, Mataitonga signed for the London Broncos after being spotted by the capital club after an impressive performance in the world cup.
 
In 2015, Mataitonga joined the Newtown Jets in the New South Wales Cup.

He is also a nephew of professional boxer Solomon Haumono.

References

1993 births
New Zealand rugby league players
New Zealand sportspeople of Tongan descent
Tonga national rugby league team players
London Broncos players
Racing Club Albi XIII players
Newtown Jets NSW Cup players
Rugby league fullbacks
Rugby league wingers
Living people